American Driver is a 2017 Nigerian comedy film directed by Moses Inwang and starring Evan King, Jim Iyke, Anita Chris, Nse Ikpe Etim, McPc the Comedian, Emma Nyra, Laura Heuston and Ayo Makun.

The film premiered in Nigeria on 24 February 2017. It grossed over ₦41 Million Naira and ranked #8 in 2017 and #44 at the all time Nigerian Box Office. The film won Best Comedy at The People's Film Festival in June 2017. American Driver was officially released in the United States September 15, 2020 on Amazon Prime Video.

Plot
Jack Curry is an American man child who takes a job driving Nigerian celebrities to the G.I.A.M.A Awards to impress his boss Kate (Anita Chris). Along his journey he tries to become friends with actor Jim Iyke, who wants to be left alone.

Cast

 Evan King as Jack Curry
 Jim Iyke as himself
 Anita Chris as Kate
 Nse Ikpe Etim as herself
 Ayo Makun as himself
 Emma Nyra as herself
 McPc the Comedian as Sunny
 Nadia Buari as herself
 Laura Heuston as Mrs. Curry
 Michael Tula as Philip
 Melvin Oduah as himself
 Johnny Dewan as Indian Restaurant Manager
 Andie Raven as Dr. Raven
 Vickey Dempsy Burns as Nurse

Release

Nigerian Theatrical Release
American Driver had its premiere in Nigeria on February 24, 2017 to theaters all over the country.

U.S. Release
In 2017 American Driver played in New York City the weekend of June 2-June 4 at The People's Film Festival and won Best Comedy Feature.
American Driver was finally released in the United States on September 15, 2020 on Amazon Prime Video.

Reception
Cinema Pointer called the film "Fresh. Fun. Entertaining."

Box office
Nigerian audiences embraced the film. American Driver opened as the #1 comedy, played for over 6 months in Nigerian cinemas and grossed over ₦41 Million Naira at the box office.

Accolades
American Driver won Best Comedy at The People's Film Festival 2017. The film was also nominated for "Comedy of the Year" at the 2017 Best of Nollywood Awards.

Actor Evan King won best comedic actor for his work in American Driver at the 2019 U.S. China International Cultural Arts Film & TV Festival.

See also
 List of Nigerian films of 2017

References

Sequel
Director Moses Inwang and actor Evan King have shown interest in returning to make American Driver 2. Evan King stated in a 2021 podcast that the film was successful enough that "They want to make a sequel. So you'll get to see what happens to "Jack" next."

External links 
 
 
 

2017 films
Films set in Houston
Films shot in Houston
American comedy films
English-language Nigerian films
2017 comedy films
Nigerian comedy films
2010s English-language films
Nigerian comedy-drama films
2010s American films